The Mongolia women's national football team represents Mongolia in international football under the control of the Mongolian Football Federation (MFF). Founded in 1959, the federation fielded its first senior women's national side for the 2019 EAFF E-1 Football Championship. Mongolia went on to earn a victory in its first-ever match, a 3–2 result over the Northern Mariana Islands. 

The following is a list of the team's official results.

2018

2021

2023

All-time record 
Key

 Pld = Matches played
 W = Matches won
 D = Matches drawn
 L = Matches lost

 GF = Goals for
 GA = Goals against
 GD = Goal differential
 Countries are listed in alphabetical order

As of 12 February 2023

References

External links
GSA List of Matches

Results
Women's national association football team results